Terelimella is a genus of sea snails, marine gastropod mollusks in the family Pyramidellidae, the pyrams and their allies.

Species
Species within the genus Terelimella include:
 Terelimella aupouria (Powell, A.W.B., 1937) 
 Terelimella benthicola Dell, R.K., 1956 
 Terelimella hutchinsoniana  Laws, C.R., 1938 
 Terelimella larochei (Powell, 1930)
 Terelimella ototarana Laws, C.R., 1938

Distribution
This marine species is endemic the waters of New Zealand.

References

External links
 To World Register of Marine Species

Pyramidellidae